Apristomimus megacephalus is a species of beetle in the family Carabidae, the only species in the genus Apristomimus.

References

Lebiinae